Alex Mellor (born 24 September 1994) is an English professional rugby league footballer who plays as a  forward and  for the Castleford Tigers in the Betfred Super League. 

He has previously played for the Bradford Bulls in the Super League and the Kingstone Press Championship, Huddersfield Giants and Leeds Rhinos in the Super League.

Background
Alex Mellor was born in Halifax, West Yorkshire, England.

Bradford Bulls
Mellor had been involved in the Bradford Bulls scholarship system from under-15's.

2013
He featured in Round 20 Warrington and Round 27 against Huddersfield.

2014
Mellor featured in the pre-season game against Hull FC.

He featured in Round 10 Wigan to Round 13 Huddersfield then in Round 21 against Huddersfield to Round 23 Leeds. He played in Round 27 London Broncos.

He signed a new one-year deal with the Bradford outfit despite their relegation to the Championship.

2015
Mellor featured in the pre-season friendlies against Castleford Tigers and Leeds.

He featured in Round 1 (Leigh) to Round 4 (Hunslet Hawks) then in Round 9 (London Broncos) to Round 16 (Doncaster). Mellor played in the Qualifier 3 against Salford to Qualifier 4 against Widnes then in Qualifier 7 Halifax. Mellor played in the Challenge Cup in Round 5 Hull Kingston Rovers.

Mid-way through the season Mellor signed a two-year extension to his contract.

2016
Mellor featured in the pre-season friendlies against Leeds and Castleford. 

He featured in Round 2 (Whitehaven) to Round 3 Swinton Lions then in Round 5 Oldham to Round 7 London Broncos. He played in Round 10 (Dewsbury Rams) to Round 13 against Swinton then in Round 15 against Leigh. Mellor featured in Round 17 (Workington Town) to Round 21 Whitehaven then in Round 23 Featherstone Rovers. Mellor featured in the Championship Shield Game 1 Whitehaven to the Final against Sheffield. Mellor played in the Challenge Cup in the 4th Round against the Dewsbury club.

Huddersfield Giants

2017
Following Bradford's liquidation before the 2017 season, he signed a three-year deal with Super League side Huddersfield.

Mellor featured in Round 1 against Widnes to Round 6 against Wigan club.

Leeds Rhinos

2020
On 17 October 2020, he played in the 2020 Challenge Cup Final victory for Leeds over Salford at Wembley Stadium.

On 21 June 2022, it was announced that Mellor had signed a two and a half year deal to join Super League rivals Castleford with immediate effect.

References

External links
Leeds Rhinos profile
Huddersfield Giants profile
Bradford Bulls profile
SL profile
Roberts Signs For Bradford

1994 births
Living people
Bradford Bulls players
Castleford Tigers players
English rugby league players
Huddersfield Giants players
Leeds Rhinos players
Rugby league players from Halifax, West Yorkshire
Rugby league second-rows